St. Charles Airport  is a privately owned airport in St. Charles Parish, Louisiana, United States. It is located one nautical mile (1.60934 km) southeast of Ama, Louisiana.

Facilities and aircraft 
St. Charles Airport covers an area of 22 acres (8 ha) at an elevation of 13 feet (4 m) above mean sea level. It has one runway designated 17/35 with a turf surface measuring 3,900 by 125 feet (1189 x 38 m).

For the 12-month period ending June 25, 2015, the airport had 900 aircraft operations, an average of 75 per month: 100% general aviation. At that time there were 32 aircraft based at this airport: 94% single-engine, 3% multi-engine, and 3% ultralight.

See also 
 List of airports in Louisiana

References

External links 
 Aeronautical chart at SkyVector
 FAA Information at AirNav

Airports in Louisiana
Transportation in St. Charles Parish, Louisiana
Buildings and structures in St. Charles Parish, Louisiana
Airports in the New Orleans metropolitan area
Transportation in the New Orleans metropolitan area
Privately owned airports